Mehmet Aksoy (February 1985 – 26 September 2017), also known as Fîraz Dağ, was a British-Kurdish filmmaker and activist. Aksoy was killed while covering the battle to retake Raqqa in Northern Syria from ISIS. He was embedded with the People's Protection Units when ISIS fighters overran a base where he was staying on 26 September 2017.

Life and work
Aksoy's family are from the Kurdish Alevi community, and were originally from the Elbistan district of Maraş (East Turkey). They moved to London from Malatya in 1988, and Aksoy's interest in the Kurdish independence movement began in 2004 when he first visited the Kurdish Community Centre in North London.

Aksoy became politicised as a result of his involvement with the Kurdish community in London and was influenced by the writings of the Black Panther George Jackson as well as Abdullah Ocalan's prison writings on Democratic Confederalism.

Aksoy studied filmmaking at Queen Mary, University of London and later Goldsmiths, University of London. His short film Panfilo, made for his MA course, was released in 2014, and won awards in the Italian Short Film Festival and the UK Student Film Awards.

Aksoy did not inform his parents of his plans before travelling to Rojava (West Kurdistan)/ (North Syria) in June 2017. He did not want to fight with the Kurdish forces in Syria, but instead wanted to tell the stories of Kurdish fighters through his films. He was the founder and editor-in-chief of the website Kurdish Question.

His uncle, Firaz, had been killed fighting for the PKK militia during its conflict with the Turkish military in the 1990s. Aksoy went by the nom-de-guerre 'Fîraz Dağ' in honour of his uncle.

After his death, more than 2,000 people turned out at a community centre in north London to pay tribute. Aksoy is the fifth British citizen to be killed in Northern Syria while fighting ISIS. He was buried on the eastern side of Highgate Cemetery in London on 10 November 2017.

References

External links 
Aksoy talks about his film Panfilo

1985 births
2017 deaths
Burials at Highgate Cemetery
Kurdish people
Kurdish film directors
British filmmakers
Journalists killed while covering the Syrian civil war
People killed by the Islamic State of Iraq and the Levant
Turkish emigrants to the United Kingdom